The 47th International Antalya Golden Orange Film Festival was a film festival held in   Antalya, Turkey which ran from October 9 to 14, 2010. Prizes were awarded in four competitions in the course of the festival, at which 191 films were shown at 12 venues across the city with the theme Cinema and Social Interaction and Italian actress Claudia Cardinale was the guest of honor.

This edition of the International Antalya Golden Orange Film Festival was the second to be organised solely by the Antalya Foundation for Culture and Arts (AKSAV), a cultural body affiliated with the Antalya Greater Municipality. Kustrica, who was to have headed the International Feature Film Competition Jury, withdrew from the festival following claims that he had supported the Serbian genocide of Muslims in Bosnia from protestors, including Turkish Minister of Culture and Tourism Ertuğrul Günay, who boycotted the opening gala, and director Semih Kaplanoğlu, who cancelled an out-of-competition screening of his film Honey.

Other events included the four kilometer annual Parade of Stars led by Antalya Mayor Mustafa Akaydın, who heads AKSAV, which featured Eşref Kolçak, Mujdat Gezen, Erkan Can, Ilker Inanoglu and Sumer Tilmac in cars decorated with carnations, and  a gala diner at which honorary awards were presented to Megan Mylan, Fyodor Bondarchuk and Serge Avedikian, and fashion designer Erol Albayrak presented his Cinema collection choreographed by Uğurkan Erez. Akaydın announced that this year the festival has been freed from the clutches of a certain group of people and has taken important steps to become a festival of the people.

Gardens of prisons in Antalya were used as a festival areas as part of social responsibility projects, with screenplay workshops organized for prisoners and screens set up for prisoners and artists to view the films together every night during the festival. The director Alan Parker and screenwriter Oliver Stone of the Oscar-winning film Midnight Express, which was set in a Turkish prison, as well as Billy Hayes, who wrote the source book, were invited to attend one such screening.

According to new regulations, the winning filmmaker will be granted half of the TL 330,000 cash prize (TL 165,000) on March 31, 2011. The remaining amount will be granted only if the filmmaker starts working on a new project within two years after the prize win. An additional TL 70,000, billed by the organizers as the Antalya Incentive Prize, will be granted only if part of the movie is filmed in Antalya, thus bringing the sum to TL 400,000. The winner of the best director award will get TL 50,000, while best screenplay gets TL 30,000.

A total of eight books, including biographies or tributes, were published for the festival under the name of Golden Orange Publications.

Awards

National Feature Competition
 Best Film: Majority directed by Seren Yüce
 Best First Film: Toll Booth directed by Tolga Karaçelik
 Best Director: Seren Yüce for Majority
 Best Actor: Serkan Ercan for Toll Booth & Bartu Küçükçağlayan for Majority
 Best Actress: Claudia Cardinale for Signora Enrica
 Special Jury Award: Press directed by Sedat Yılmaz

International Feature Competition
 Best Film: Cirkus Columbia directed by Danis Tanović & Dooman River directed by Zhang Lu
 Best Director: Lancelot von Naso for 
 Best Actor: Nik Xhelilaj for The Albanian
 Best Actress: Emma Suárez for The Mosquito Net
 Special Jury Award: Meryem Uzerli (actress) for Journey of No Return

Honorary Awards
 Cinema Labor Award: Necmettin Çobanoğlu
 Yıldırım Önal Memorial Award: Yıldız Kenter (actress)
 Social Responsibility in Arts Award: Müjdat Gezen (actor, entrepreneur, writer and poet)
 Lifetime Achievement Award: Zeki Alasya and Metin Akpınar (theatre and film comedy duo )
 Lifetime Achievement Award: Gülşen Bubikoğlu (actress)
 Lifetime Achievement Award: Nur Sürer (actress)
 Lifetime Achievement Award: Safa Önal (screenwriter)
 Lifetime Achievement Award: Ertem Göreç (director and screenwriter)
 Honorary Award: Megan Mylan (documentarian)
 Honorary Award: Fyodor Bondarchuk (filmmaker)
 Honorary Award: Serge Avedikian (filmmaker)

Programmes

National Feature Competition
Fifteen nominees, including nine by first time directors, were initially selected from the record forty-seven films which were submitted for the National Feature Competition of this edition of the festival, but Honey directed by Semih Kaplanoğlu had to be withdrawn under competition rules after winning the Grand Jury Best Picture award at the 17th International Adana Golden Boll Film Festival.

National Feature Competition Jury
Kadir İnanır
Tomris Giritlioğlu
Meltem Cumbul
Meral Okay
Murathan Mungan
Gökhan Kırdar
Atilla Dorsay
Zinos Panagiotidis
Mehmet Aktekin

Films in competition
Zephyr directed by Belma Baş
Merry-Go-Round directed by İlksen Başarır
Black and White directed by Ahmet Boyacıoğlu
Paper directed by Sinan Çetin
The Crossing directed by Selim Demirdelen
White as Snow directed by Selim Güneş
Signora Enrica directed by Ali İlhan
Toll Booth directed by Tolga Karaçelik
Jackal directed by Erhan Kozan
Hayde Bre directed by Orhan Oğuz
Hair directed by Tayfun Pirselimoğlu
Press directed by Sedat Yılmaz
Majority directed by Seren Yüce
Shadows and Faces directed by Derviş Zaim

International Feature Competition
Eleven nominees, including one Turkish film, were selected for the International Feature Competition of this edition of the festival. Serbian filmmaker Emir Kusturica, who was to head the competition jury, was forced to withdraw from the festival after protests from various Turkish groups that claimed he supported the Serbian genocide of Muslims in Bosnia.

International Feature Film Competition Jury
Emir Kusturica (withdrawn)

Films in competition
Brought by the Sea directed by Nesli Çölgeçen
Silent Souls directed by Aleksei Fedorchenko
 directed by Cihan Inan
Echoes of the Rainbow (romanisation: Shui Yuet Sun Tau; literally "Time, the Thief") directed by Alex Law
Dooman River directed by Zhang Lu
The Albanian directed by Johannes Naber
Hitler in Hollywood directed by Frédéric Sojcher
Cirkus Columbia directed by Danis Tanović
Clash of Civilizations Over an Elevator in Piazza Vittorio directed by Isotta Toso
The Mosquito Net directed by Agustí Vila
 directed by Lancelot von Naso

National Documentary Competition
Twenty nominees were selected for the National Documentary Competition of this edition of the festival.

National Documentary Competition Jury
Megan Mylan
Coşkun Aral

National Short Film Competition

National Short Film Competition Jury
Serge Avedikian
Mehmet Bahadır Er

See also
 2010 in film
 Turkish films of 2010

External links
  for the festival

References

Antalya Golden Orange
Antalya Golden Orange Film Festival
Antalya Golden Orange Film Festival
21st century in Antalya